More than a Game is a 2008 American documentary film that follows basketball superstar LeBron James and four of his teammates through the trials and tribulations of high school basketball in Akron, Ohio, and James's journey to fame. The film trailer was released in April featuring the single "Stronger" by Mary J. Blige, which she released in support of the film. The soundtrack titled Music Inspired by More than a Game was released September 28, 2009. The film had limited theatrical release on October 2, 2009.

Synopsis
More than a Game is a documentary that focuses in on five young basketball players—LeBron James, Dru Joyce III, Romeo Travis, Sian Cotton, Willie McGee—and their coach, Dru Joyce II, performing on an AAU team with the growing stardom of the future NBA superstar, LeBron James. Taking them through their pre-teens to high school, this film follows their incredible journey as the unknown Ohio team rises to the top of youth athletics.

Cast
 LeBron James as himself
 Dru Joyce III as himself
 Romeo Travis as himself
 Sian Cotton as himself
 Willie McGee as himself
 (Coach) Dru Joyce II as himself

Soundtrack

The music is mainly inspired by A. J. Mighton and John Colwill. An executive producer of the movie, Harvey Mason Jr., also is an executive producer of the soundtrack album, Music Inspired by More than a Game. The album was due for release on September 28, 2009, in the UK and September 29 in the US. Interscope is the main record label involved although Polow da Don's label Zone 4 inc/productions Mason's Harvey Mason Media the main production associates and publishers involved. Producers for the project include Boi-1da, Danielle Rayna, Polow da Don and Jerome Harmon amongst others.

The soundtrack features songs from Ester Dean, Drake, T.I., Mary J. Blige, Jay-Z, and Soulja Boy, amongst others. The album also features additional vocals or raps from Chris Brown, Kanye West, Lil Wayne, Eminem, Toni Braxton, JoJo, Jordin Sparks, Ya Boy, Omarion, and Faith Evans plus others. A number of songs were released as singles. First, "Stronger" by Mary J Blige is the soundtrack's lead single and was released on August 4, 2009, to support the film and later on August 21, 2009, as the second single from Blige's ninth studio album also titled Stronger. "Drop It Low" by Ester Dean (with Chris Brown) was released as a single on August 9, 2009, while "Forever" by Drake (featuring Kanye West, Lil Wayne, & Eminem) was released as a single on September 15, 2009.

Reception

Box office
More than a Game opened with $182,943 in its first weekend and grossed a total of $960,387, $950,675 in the United States and Canada, and $9,712 worldwide.

Critical response
On the review aggregator Rotten Tomatoes, the film has an approval rating of 71%, based on 52 reviews, with an average rating of 6.4/10. The site's critical consensus reads, "Though the film may not delve as deep as some would prefer, More than a Game is an inspiring documentary featuring likable youngsters, a positive message, and some exciting in-game footage." On Metacritic, the film has a score of 59 out of 100, based on 18 reviews, indicating "mixed or average reviews".

References

External links
 
 
 

2008 films
American basketball films
American sports documentary films
Documentary films about basketball
Lionsgate films
LeBron James
Sports in Akron, Ohio
Films set in Akron, Ohio
Films shot in Ohio
High school basketball in the United States
Basketball in Ohio
2008 directorial debut films
Documentary films about Ohio
2000s English-language films
2000s American films